Saint Vincent and the Grenadines was represented at the 2006 Commonwealth Games in Melbourne.

The BBC's Hazel Irving made a classic faux-pas during her commentary of the Opening Ceremony. She was relating that St Vincent had gained a number of medals over the years, but that this seems to have stopped as "they joined forces with the Grenadines" (sic).

Medals

Athletics

Men
Track and road events

Field events

Key
Note–Ranks given for track events are within the athlete's heat only
Q = Qualified for the next round
q = Qualified for the next round as a fastest loser or, in field events, by position without achieving the qualifying target
NR = National record
N/A = Round not applicable for the event
Bye = Athlete not required to compete in round

Netball

Saint Vincent and the Grenadines qualified a team.

See also
Saint Vincent and the Grenadines at the 2004 Summer Olympics
Saint Vincent and the Grenadines at the 2007 Pan American Games
Saint Vincent and the Grenadines at the 2008 Summer Olympics

Nations at the 2006 Commonwealth Games
2006
Commonwealth Games